The Air Ceylon Avro 748 4R-ACJ bombing occurred on 7 September 1978 when an Air Ceylon Hawker Siddeley HS 748 (registered 4R-ACJ) was destroyed in a fire following the explosion of a bomb in the aircraft while parked at Ratmalana Airport, Colombo, Sri Lanka. At the time, the pilot, first officer, and a ground crew worker were aboard; all three escaped unhurt.

On 7 September 1978, the Air Ceylon 4R-ACJ landed in Ratmalana Airport following an internal flight from Jaffna Airport. A replacement crew - Captain Ronnie Perera and First Officer Ranjit Pedris - boarded the aircraft to ferry it to Bandaranaike International Airport for the next scheduled flight to Malé. When they started the pre-flight checklist, Captain Perera found the cabin untidy and ordered it cleaned, delaying take-off. Pedris continued the pre-flight checks while Perera supervised cleaning. Shortly thereafter an explosion rocked the aircraft. Pedris was in the cockpit and exited the aircraft, while Perera and the cleaner exited the aircraft from the rear door. The control tower alerted emergency services which responded, but equipment limitations prevented them from stopping the fire from destroying the aircraft completely. Had the flight not been delayed for cleaning, the bomb would have detonated mid-flight; the delay likely saved many lives.
       
An immediate cordon of the airport was carried out and all passengers on the flight from Jaffna were detained and questioned. Captain Errol Cramer, pilot of the flight from Jaffna to Colombo, had noticed two passengers loitering in the cabin before departing. In the subsequent investigation, two men who had traveled on that flight were arrested, tried and found guilty of placing a bomb under a seat before leaving the aircraft. They were identified as members of the movement that later became the Liberation Tigers of Tamil Eelam.

See also
Air Lanka Flight 512 
Lionair Flight 602

References 

Accidents and incidents involving the Hawker Siddeley HS 748
Airliner bombings
Attacks on civilians attributed to the Liberation Tigers of Tamil Eelam
Aviation accidents and incidents in 1978
Massacres in Sri Lanka
Liberation Tigers of Tamil Eelam attacks against airliners
Liberation Tigers of Tamil Eelam attacks in Eelam War I
September 1978 events in Asia
SriLankan Airlines accidents and incidents
Terrorist incidents in Sri Lanka in 1978